Gymnocalycium saglionis, the giant chin cactus, is a globular cactus species endemic to northwest Argentina.

The cacti's most common native habitats are withinin the Argentine provinces of  Salta, Tucuman, Catamarca, San Juan, and La Rioja. It grows on rocky soil with other low vegetation.

Description
Named after J. Saglio, an important plant collector in France around 1840, Gymnocalycium saglionis is known to grow very slowly, and grow best in warm and part shady conditions, but tolerate extremely bright situations although they are likely to suffer from sun scorch or stunted growth if over exposed to direct sunlight during the hottest part of the day in summer.

The body can range from dull-green or blue-green, almost cylindrical more or less flattened up to 40 cm in diameter, up to 90 cm tall. Spines can grown to 3−4 cm long, colors varies from yellowish-brown, reddish or white becoming grey with time which contrast well against the green body, 1−3 centrals and 10−15 radials bent against the stem.

Spines become bright red when wet.

Flowers 1.4 inch (3.5 cm) long, white or reddish, often more than one simultaneously. Fruits globular, reddish or dark pink, splits sideways with tiny, shiny black brown seeds.

Cultivation
Gymnocalycium saglionis is cultivated as an ornamental plant around the world, and is commonly for sale. Plants are large and have thick curved spines making this species popular among collectors.

In the UK it has gained the Royal Horticultural Society's Award of Garden Merit.

Gallery

References

saglionis
Cacti of South America
Garden plants of South America
Endemic flora of Argentina
Flora of Northwest Argentina
Plants described in 1922